The catty, kati or , pronounced as jīn in Mandarin and gan in Cantonese, is a traditional Chinese unit of mass used across East and Southeast Asia, notably for weighing food and other groceries in some wet markets, street markets, and shops. A stone is a former unit used in Hong Kong equal to 120 catties and a gwan (鈞) is 30 catties. Catty or kati is still used in Southeast Asia as a unit of measurement in some contexts especially by the significant Overseas Chinese populations across the region, particularly in Malaysia and Singapore.

The catty is traditionally equivalent to around  pound avoirdupois, formalised as 604.78982 grams in Hong Kong, 604.5 grams historically in Vietnam, 604.79 grams in Malaysia and 604.8 grams in Singapore. In some countries, the weight has been rounded to 600 grams (Taiwan, Japan, Korea and Thailand). In mainland China, the catty (more commonly translated as jin within China) has been rounded to 500 grams and is referred to as the market catty (市斤 shìjīn) in order to distinguish it from the "common catty" (公斤 gōngjīn), or kilogram, and it is subdivided into 10 taels rather than the usual 16.

Etymology 
The word catty comes from Malay kati, meaning the weight. It has also been borrowed into English as caddy, meaning a container for storing tea.

See also
 Caddy (disambiguation)
 Chinese units of measurement
 Japanese units of measurement
 Korean units of measurement
 Taiwanese units of measurement
 Vietnamese units of measurement
 Tea caddy

References

Chinese units in Hong Kong
Units of mass